The Women's Hockey Africa Cup of Nations is an international women's field hockey tournament governed by African Hockey Federation. The winning team becomes the champions of Africa and qualified for the FIH Hockey World Cup.

Qualification
The top two highest-ranked teams in the FIH World Rankings qualify directly for the tournament while the other teams have to play in the regional qualifiers. The top two teams from each of the regional qualifiers qualify for the tournament. The three regions are Northeast Africa, Northwest Africa, and Central south Africa.

Results

Summary

* = hosts

Team appearances

See also
Field hockey at the African Games
Men's Hockey Africa Cup of Nations
Women's African Olympic Qualifier

References

 
 
African championships
Recurring sporting events established in 1990